Novaya Vasilyevka is a rural locality (a village) in Ayuchevsky Selsoviet, Sterlitamaksky District, Bashkortostan, Russia. The population was 246 as of 2010. There are 3 streets.

Geography 
Novaya Vasilyevka is located 23 km south of Sterlitamak (the district's administrative centre) by road. Novonikolayevsky is the nearest rural locality.

References 

Rural localities in Sterlitamaksky District